Charles Robert Crisp (October 19, 1870 – February 7, 1937) was a U.S. Representative from Georgia, son of Charles Frederick Crisp.

Life 
Born in Ellaville, Georgia, Crisp attended the public schools of Americus, Georgia.
He served as clerk in the Interior Department, Washington, D.C. from 1889 to 1891.
Parliamentarian of the House of Representatives 1891-1895.
He studied law.
He was admitted to the bar in 1895 and commenced practice in Americus, Georgia.

Crisp was elected as a Democrat to the Fifty-fourth Congress to fill the vacancy caused by the death of his father, Charles F. Crisp, and served from December 19, 1896, to March 3, 1897.
He was not a candidate for renomination in 1896.
He resumed the practice of law in Americus, Georgia.
He served as judge of the city court of Americus 1900-1912.
Again parliamentarian of the House of Representatives in the Sixty-second Congress.
Parliamentarian of the Democratic National Convention in 1912.

Crisp was elected to the Sixty-third and to the nine succeeding Congresses and served from March 4, 1913, until October 7, 1932, when he resigned to become a member of the United States Tariff Commission, in which capacity he served until December 30, 1932.
He was not a candidate for renomination in 1932, but was an unsuccessful candidate for the nomination for United States Senator to fill the vacancy occasioned by the death of William J. Harris.
He served as member of the American World War Debt Funding Commission.
He resumed the practice of his chosen profession in Washington, D.C.
He died in Americus, Georgia, February 7, 1937.
He was interred in Oak Grove Cemetery.

References

External links
 

1870 births
1937 deaths
American people of English descent
Democratic Party members of the United States House of Representatives from Georgia (U.S. state)
People from Americus, Georgia
People from Schley County, Georgia